To Hell or Barbados is the fourth studio album by Irish singer-songwriter Damien Dempsey released in Ireland and the UK in June 2007. An expanded edition was released on 2 November 2007, complete with a bonus CD of additional material.

The album name and title track are taken from the book of the same name by Sean O'Callaghan, a garbled account of the thousands of Irish people transported to the Caribbean during the Cromwellian conquest of Ireland (see Irish slaves myth).

The album features Irish folk musician Sharon Shannon and sisters Yamina and Nadia Nid El Mourid from the French band Lo'Jo

Track listing

To Hell or Barbados: The Expanded Edition
Additional tracks:
 "Not on Your Own Tonight (Part 2)"
 "Saturday Finally Comes"
 "Wild One"
 "Schooldays Over"
 "Fly Me to the Moon"
 "Taobh Leis an Muir"
 "The Rhythm of Time"
 "Holy Night"

Personnel
 Damien Dempsey - acoustic guitar
 Caroline Dale - cello
 John Reynolds - drums
 Sharon Shannon - accordion
 Marco Pirroni - guitar
 Claire Kenny - bass instrument
 Julian Wilson - Hammond b-3 organ
 Conor McKeon - pipes
 Nadia Nid El Mourid - background vocals
 Yamina Nid el Mourid
 Gerry O'Connor - banjo

References

2007 albums
Damien Dempsey albums